Tetrahydroharmol is a bioactive beta-carboline harmala alkaloid. It acts as a reversible inhibitor of monoamine oxidase A.

Legal Status

Australia
Harmala alkaloids are considered Schedule 9 prohibited substances under the Poisons Standard (October 2015). A Schedule 9 substance is a substance which may be abused or misused, the manufacture, possession, sale or use of which should be prohibited by law except when required for medical or scientific research, or for analytical, teaching or training purposes with approval of Commonwealth and/or State or Territory Health Authorities.

See also 
 Tetrahydroharmine
 Harmol

References 

Tryptamine alkaloids
Beta-Carbolines